David Izonritei (born 29 April 1968) is a Nigerian former boxer.  Also known as David Izon, Izonritei won the Heavyweight silver medal at the 1992 Summer Olympics. During his professional career, he defeated world title challengers Derrick Jefferson and Lou Savarese.

Amateur career
Izon had an amateur record that included a silver medal at the 1992 Barcelona Olympics. On his way to the silver medal Izon beat the highly regarded pair of David Tua of New Zealand, and Kirk Johnson of Canada. He lost to Félix Savón of Cuba in the final.

Professional career
Izon began his pro career with 18 consecutive victories prior to being upset by Maurice Harris. In his next fight Izon took on David Tua, and after 11 rounds of action, Tua knocked out Izon. Izon notably defeated Lou Savarese before losing to Michael Grant, who was undefeated at the time of the fight. Izon then put together a streak of wins before losing his last three fights and retiring from boxing in 2003.

Professional boxing record

|-
|align="center" colspan=8|27 Wins (23 knockouts, 4 decisions), 6 Losses (4 knockouts, 2 decisions) 
|-
| align="center" style="border-style: none none solid solid; background: #e3e3e3"|Result
| align="center" style="border-style: none none solid solid; background: #e3e3e3"|Record
| align="center" style="border-style: none none solid solid; background: #e3e3e3"|Opponent
| align="center" style="border-style: none none solid solid; background: #e3e3e3"|Type
| align="center" style="border-style: none none solid solid; background: #e3e3e3"|Round
| align="center" style="border-style: none none solid solid; background: #e3e3e3"|Date
| align="center" style="border-style: none none solid solid; background: #e3e3e3"|Location
| align="center" style="border-style: none none solid solid; background: #e3e3e3"|Notes
|-align=center
|Loss
|
|align=left| Al Cole
|UD
|8
|01/03/2003
|align=left| Las Vegas, Nevada, U.S.
|align=left|
|-
|Loss
|
|align=left| Joe Mesi
|KO
|9
|18/10/2002
|align=left| Buffalo, New York, U.S.
|align=left|
|-
|Loss
|
|align=left| Fres Oquendo
|TKO
|3
|01/12/2001
|align=left| New York City, U.S.
|align=left|
|-
|Win
|
|align=left| Mike Sedillo
|TKO
|3
|20/10/2000
|align=left| Auburn Hills, Michigan, U.S.
|align=left|
|-
|Win
|
|align=left| Reynaldo Minus
|TKO
|2
|20/05/2000
|align=left| Biloxi, Mississippi, U.S.
|align=left|
|-
|Win
|
|align=left| Derrick Jefferson
|TKO
|9
|15/01/2000
|align=left| New York City, U.S.
|align=left|
|-
|Win
|
|align=left| Garing Lane
|UD
|8
|28/08/1999
|align=left| Tunica, Mississippi, U.S.
|align=left|
|-
|Win
|
|align=left| Terrence Lewis
|KO
|5
|04/06/1999
|align=left| Biloxi, Mississippi, U.S.
|align=left|
|-
|Win
|
|align=left| Darroll Wilson
|KO
|4
|14/11/1998
|align=left| Mashantucket, Connecticut, U.S.
|align=left|
|-
|Win
|
|align=left| Marion Wilson
|UD
|8
|18/07/1998
|align=left| New York City, U.S.
|align=left|
|-
|Loss
|
|align=left| Michael Grant
|TKO
|5
|17/01/1998
|align=left| Atlantic City, New Jersey, U.S.
|align=left|
|-
|Win
|
|align=left| Lou Savarese
|KO
|5
|01/11/1997
|align=left| New York City, U.S.
|align=left|
|-
|Win
|
|align=left| Harry Daniels
|KO
|1
|11/09/1997
|align=left| Tallahassee, Florida, U.S.
|align=left|
|-
|Loss
|
|align=left| David Tua
|TKO
|12
|21/12/1996
|align=left| Uncasville, Connecticut, U.S.
|align=left|
|-
|Loss
|
|align=left| Maurice Harris
|UD
|8
|15/03/1996
|align=left| Atlantic City, New Jersey, U.S.
|align=left|
|-
|Win
|
|align=left| Brian Morgan
|TKO
|8
|15/12/1995
|align=left| Sedan, Ardennes, France
|align=left|
|-
|Win
|
|align=left| Cleveland Woods
|TKO
|8
|04/11/1995
|align=left| Las Vegas, Nevada, U.S.
|align=left|
|-
|Win
|
|align=left| Kimmuel Odum
|TKO
|5
|24/10/1995
|align=left| Levallois-Perret, France
|align=left|
|-
|Win
|
|align=left| Marion Wilson
|DQ
|5
|23/08/1995
|align=left| Le Cannet, France
|align=left|
|-
|Win
|
|align=left| Dan Kosmicki
|TKO
|5
|02/07/1995
|align=left| Dublin, Ireland
|align=left|
|-
|Win
|
|align=left| Arturo Lopez
|KO
|2
|11/04/1995
|align=left| Levallois-Perret, France
|align=left|
|-
|Win
|
|align=left| Bill Corrigan
|KO
|1
|01/04/1995
|align=left| Levallois-Perret, France
|align=left|
|-
|Win
|
|align=left| Ali Allen
|KO
|2
|04/03/1995
|align=left| Atlantic City, New Jersey, U.S.
|align=left|
|-
|Win
|
|align=left| Mike Robinson
|TKO
|5
|04/02/1995
|align=left| Beziers, France
|align=left|
|-
|Win
|
|align=left| William Campudani
|KO
|1
|03/12/1994
|align=left| Salta, Argentina
|align=left|
|-
|Win
|
|align=left| Isaac Poole
|KO
|2
|16/11/1994
|align=left| Buenos Aires, Argentina
|align=left|
|-
|Win
|
|align=left| Rick Sullivan
|PTS
|6
|29/10/1994
|align=left| Menucourt, France
|align=left|
|-
|Win
|
|align=left| Krishna Wainwright
|TKO
|6
|14/07/1994
|align=left| Monte Carlo, Monaco
|align=left|
|-
|Win
|
|align=left| Laszlo Paszterko
|TKO
|3
|17/04/1994
|align=left| Clermont-Ferrand, France
|align=left|
|-
|Win
|
|align=left| Phillipe Houyvet
|TKO
|5
|19/03/1994
|align=left| Levallois-Perret, France
|align=left|
|-
|Win
|
|align=left| Jean Michel Vauquelin
|TKO
|2
|12/02/1994
|align=left| Cergy-Pontoise, France
|align=left|
|-
|Win
|
|align=left| Earl Talley
|KO
|1
|16/10/1993
|align=left| Levallois-Perret, France
|align=left|
|-
|Win
|
|align=left| Carlos Guerreiro
|TKO
|1
|06/03/1993
|align=left| Levallois-Perret, France
|align=left|
|}

Personal
David's brothers, Roger and Emmanuel Izonritei, are also professional boxers.
David lives in Pensacola, FL with his wife, Laurence (French) and two children, Melissa and Ian.

References

External links
 

1963 births
Living people
Boxers at the 1992 Summer Olympics
Olympic boxers of Nigeria
Olympic silver medalists for Nigeria
Sportspeople from Lagos
Olympic medalists in boxing
Nigerian male boxers
Medalists at the 1992 Summer Olympics
African Games gold medalists for Nigeria
African Games medalists in boxing
Competitors at the 1991 All-Africa Games
Heavyweight boxers